"The Young Folks" is a song by Diana Ross and the Supremes, released as the B-side to "No Matter What Sign You Are" in 1969. Written by Allen Story and George Gordy, "The Young Folks" was included on the album Cream of the Crop (1969). In addition to appearing on the Canadian RPM Top Singles and US Billboard and Cashbox charts, "The Young Folks" reached number five on Jets Soul Brothers Top 20. The song was covered by the Jackson 5, on the album ABC (1970).

Charts

References

The Supremes songs
1969 songs
1969 singles
Motown singles
Songs written by George Gordy